Villa Popolo is a small village in the province of Teramo, in the Abruzzo region of central Italy. It is a frazione of the comune of Torricella Sicura.

Geography
It is located next to the small community of Ioanella and about 1.5 miles from Teramo, the provincial capital.

The village of Villa Popola is divided into three small localities: Villa Torre (site of most of the residences), Popolo Alta and Popola Bassa.  The last two locations are dominated by small, often economically impoverished, clusters of farmsteads.

History
Villa Popolo is famous for the Church of Saint Bartholomew containing precious frescoes.  Historical records from the year 1267 make mention of this important parish church and interior and exterior engravings suggest that a renovation was completed the 1684.   It is somewhat unusual for a church this small and isolated to have such frescoes dating back to this time period.  Ceiling frieze decorations depict saints and martyrs in symbolic form.  Notable is their having been painted in the style of the great Spanish cathedral in Toledo.  They have been signed although it is not entirely clear if the names on the paintings refer to the master scenic artist or to an assistant.  It goes without saying that such precious masterpieces of this genre are quite rare in the Abruzzo region.

Festivals
Each year, during the first part of June, the "Sagra del Formaggio Fritto" (Festival of Fried Cheese) takes place.  In addition to a celebration of this famous dish, other delicacies and local wines are available for tasting.  Exhibitions feature the transhumance (migrations of sheep and shepherds from lowland areas of Abruzzo and leading to higher grazing lands in Apulia, Lazio, and other parts of southern Italy).  Various displays also depict the ancient professions of milling, cheese production, forestry, and woodworking.

See also
Abruzzo (wine)

Notes and references

Frazioni of the Province of Teramo